The 2013–14 Faysal Bank T20 Cup was the tenth season of the Faysal Bank T20 Cup in Pakistan, sponsored by Faysal Bank. The tournament was held from 6 to 16 February 2014 at Rawalpindi Cricket Stadium, Rawalpindi; Diamond Ground, Islamabad; Marghazar Ground, Islamabad and National Ground, Islamabad. A total of 17 Teams were divided into four groups, this was the most teams in the tournament's history. The highlight of this tournament was the inclusion for the first time of three new teams: FATA Cheetahs, Dera Murad Jamali Ibexes and Larkana Bulls.
Broadcasting rights were given to PTV Sports who aired all of the matches live.

Venue
The twin cities of Rawalpindi and Islamabad were chosen as host cities for this tournament and 4 stadiums were picked to host it. The Pindi Stadium in Rawalpindi and the Diamond Cricket Ground, National Cricket Ground and Marghzar Cricket Ground in Islamabad. 14 matches were held in Islamabad while 20 matches, all of the knockout stage matches were held in Rawalpindi.

Team Sponsors
The Faysal Bank T20 Cup 2014 Team Sponsors Press Conference was held in, Islamabad on 5 February 2014 announced brand new logos of the teams as well as new sponsors.

Tournament
The tournament was scheduled to be held between 6 and 16 February 2014. Tournament is a Round Robin and Knockout tournament.

Group stage
A total of 17 Teams divided into four groups are participating in this tournament. The top two teams from each group qualified for the quarter-finals. A total of 28 matches were be played from 6 February 2014 to 12 February 2014.

Group A

Group B

Group C

Group D

Knockout stage

Quarter-finals

Semi-finals

Final

Statistics

References

2013-14 National T20 Cup
2013 in Pakistani cricket
2014 in Pakistani cricket
Domestic cricket competitions in 2013–14
Pakistani cricket seasons from 2000–01